Epicillin (INN) is a penicillin antibiotic. It is not approved by the FDA for use in the United States.

It is an aminopenicillin.

References 

Penicillins
Enantiopure drugs